Ashland is a borough in Schuylkill County in the U.S. state of Pennsylvania,  northwest of Pottsville. It is part of Northeastern Pennsylvania. A small part of the borough also lies in Columbia County, although all of the population resided in the Schuylkill County portion as of the 2020 census. The borough lies in the anthracite coal region of eastern Pennsylvania. Settled in 1850, Ashland was incorporated in 1857, and was named for Henry Clay's estate near Lexington, Kentucky. The population in 1900 was 6,438, and in 1940, 7,045, but had dropped to 2,471 at the 2020 census.

Ashland is part of the Pottsville micropolitan statistical area.

It is the location of Pioneer Tunnel, a tourist attraction featuring a tour of a coal mine on mine cars and a separate  narrow gauge steam train ride.

History
For a long time after southern Pennsylvania was settled, the area that is now Ashland was mostly wilderness except for a hotel in the area in 1820. A prominent citizen of the county, Burd S. Patterson, however, predicted that the area would eventually become a prominent mining town. In 1845, John P. Brock and James Hart joined Patterson in buying  of land in the Ashland area. In 1846, a group of miners led by Patrick Devine developed coal seams in veins in the area. However, the town progressed little over the next three years. By 1857, though, the town had 3,500 people, and Ashland became a borough, detaching itself from Butler Township. The first post office was built in 1853, and the first church was built in 1855.

The "Mothers' Memorial" is located at the junction of Pennsylvania Route 54 and Pennsylvania Route 61. The "Mothers' Memorial" is a bronze reproduction of the famous James Abbott McNeill Whistler artistic painting: "An Arrangement in Grey and Black No. 1", commonly known as "Whistler's Mother". The WPA-built "Mothers' Memorial" honors all mothers of the United States and it's the only one of its kind in the world. It was designed by the sculptor Emil Siebern, carried out by Julius C. Loester, commissioned and erected during the misery of the Great Depression in the United States by the Ashland Boys' Association and dedicated on Sunday, September 4, 1938, during Labor Day weekend. President Franklin D. Roosevelt economic recovery plan of the Works Progress Administration (WPA) carried out the stone masonry work.

The Ashland Boys' Association was an inspirational story of former residents of Ashland who had to leave town for work when the anthracite mining failed in the late 1800s. Ashland men returned home every Labor Day weekend for little more than a century to visit the old hometown and march in the grand Ashland Boys' Association Mummers' Parade. This unique show of attachment to family, friends, and comforts of home erected the WPA-built Mothers' Memorial statue that became the Ashland Boys' Association's legacy – an American icon and a symbol of motherhood in the United States. The Ashland Boys' Association was honored with a State Historical Marker by the Pennsylvania Historical and Museum Commission on August 31, 2013.

Goyne Brothers was a family owned firm that came into existence in 1881. Goyne Brothers which later changed the name in 1903 to Goyne Steam Pump Company were manufacturers of general mining machinery, and in 1883, they determined to make the manufacture of mining pumps as a specialty. The Goyne Steam Pump Company in 1911, became known as one of the most substantial exclusive mine pump manufacturing plants in the United States. The importance of coal mining drainage launched out mine pumpers exclusively and the Goyne Steam Pump Company invented, engineered, manufactured, and sold over 250 different mining pump designs and sizes, ranging from single pump up to the largest compound condensing duplex machines practicable for mining purposes throughout the anthracite and bituminous coal regions of Pennsylvania, and the United States. The Goyne Steam Pump Company changed the name to Goyne Pump Company in 1955, and the company was purchased in 1979 by Goulds Pumps.

The Ashland Greens were an independent basketball franchise in Ashland. The Ashland Greens played the Boston Celtics in the Ashland High School Gymnasium. The team was owned by Green's Dairy.

Pennsylvania Route 61 takes a detour just north of Ashland, where a "Keep Out" sign straddles the original highway that used to lead to the abandoned town of Centralia, where an underground mine fire has been burning since 1962.

Points of interest
Mothers’ Memorial (Whistler's Mother Statue) - North Hoffman Boulevard
Ashland Boys’ Association Pennsylvania Historical Marker – North Hoffman Boulevard
Pioneer Tunnel Coal Mine and Steam Train – 19th and Oak Streets
Ashland Area Historic Preservation Society Museum – 316-318 Centre Street
Station House – 5th and Chestnut Street
Dr. J. L. Hoffman Memorial – South Hoffman Blvd and Spruce Street
The Museum of Anthracite Mining – S. 19th Street (adjacent to Pioneer Tunnel) 
Military Veterans Monument – Hoffman Blvd and Centre Street
World War I Field Piece – 5th and Chestnut Street
Washington Fire Company Historic Bell Tower/Fog Horn – 1307 Centre Street
Ashland Town Clock – 5th and Centre Streets
Ashland Little League – Eureka Park

Geography 

Ashland is located along the northern boundary of Schuylkill County at  (40.781587, -76.344426). A small portion of the borough, comprising less than 1% of its area, extends north into Columbia County. Butler Township of Schuylkill County borders Ashland to the east, south, and west, while Conyngham Township of Columbia County borders the borough to the north.

Ashland is served by Pennsylvania Route 54 and Pennsylvania Route 61. PA 61 leads north  to Centralia and then west  farther to Mount Carmel, and east  to Frackville. The two highways share Centre Street, the main street through Ashland.

The majority of Ashland is forest, with an urban area in the center. Most of the borough's terrain is steep hills, but the hills are gentler near the center.

Demographics 

As of the census of 2010, there were 2,817 people, 1,301 households, and 776 families living in the borough. There were 1,677 housing units with a vacancy rate of 22.4%. The racial makeup of the borough was 98.2% White, 0.2% African American, 0.1% Native American, 0.3% Asian, and 0.2% other. 1.0% were from two or more races, and Hispanic or Latino were 1.0% of any race.

As of the census of 2000, there were 3,283 people, 1,437 households, and 863 families living in the borough. The population density was 1,886 people per square mile (728.5/km²). There were 1,724 housing units at an average density of 990.4 per square mile (382.6/km²). The racial makeup of the borough was 99.39% White, 0.21% African American, 0.09% Asian, 0.06% from other races, and 0.24% from two or more races. Hispanic or Latino of any race were 0.09% of the population.

Of the 1,437 households 24.6% had children under the age of 18 living with them, 43.6% were married couples living together, 12.5% had a female householder with no husband present, and 39.9% were non-families. 36.4% of all households were made up of individuals, and 21.7% had someone living alone who was 65 years of age or older. The average household size was 2.28 and the average family size was 3.00.
 
21.1% of the population were under the age of 18, 8.1% from age 18 to 24, 27.0% from 25 to 44, 23.4% from 45 to 64, and 20.4% who were 65 years of age or older. The median age was 41 years. For every 100 females, there were 93.9 males. For every 100 females age 18 and over, there were 90.0 males.

The median income for a household in the borough was $27,234, and the median income for a family was $34,688. Males had a median income of $30,500 versus $20,920 for females. The per capita income for the borough was $15,036. About 11.1% of families and 12.8% of the population were below the poverty line, including 16.1% of those under age 18 and 13.4% of those age 65 or over.

Education
All school-age residents of Ashland attend North Schuylkill School, along Pennsylvania Route 61 located at 15 Academy Lane Ashland (physical address) in nearby Butler Township. The school comprises one elementary school building (K-6) and one upper campus high school (7-12).

Notable people
 Janet Asimov, American science fiction writer, psychiatrist, and psychoanalyst
 Tom Burns, member of the Professional Baseball Scouts Hall of Fame
 Bill Dando, professional football coach and player
 Mickey Doolan, professional baseball player and coach
 Dennis Joseph Dougherty, Archbishop of the Roman Catholic Archdiocese of Philadelphia, and Cardinal
 Woody Erdman, American sportscaster, television producer, and businessman
 Alfred Buckwalter Garner, Republican member of the U.S. House of Representatives from Pennsylvania
 Griffith J. Griffith, Welsh-American industrialist and philanthropist
 Robert Douglas Heaton, Republican member of the U.S. House of Representatives from Pennsylvania
 Doggie Julian, Hall of Fame basketball coach
 Carson Long, NFL  Player (Buffalo Bills), Member 1976 NCAA National Champion University of Pittsburgh Panthers Football team
 George Robert Patterson, Republican member of the U.S. House of Representatives from Pennsylvania
 Edmund William Samuel, Republican member of the U.S. House of Representatives from Pennsylvania
 Emil Seidel, mayor of Milwaukee, Wisconsin, and first socialist mayor of a major U.S. city
 Robert Spencer, doctor and safe abortion provider
 Charles W. Staudenmeier, Republican member of the PA House of Representatives and State Senate, Schuykill County Court Judge of Common Pleas (1947-1967)
 Jack Stivetts, professional baseball player
 William J. Waltersheid, Bishop of the Roman Catholic Diocese of Pittsburgh

References

External links

Borough of Ashland official website

Populated places established in 1820
1857 establishments in Pennsylvania
Municipalities of the Anthracite Coal Region of Pennsylvania
Bloomsburg–Berwick metropolitan area
Boroughs in Columbia County, Pennsylvania
Boroughs in Schuylkill County, Pennsylvania
Coal towns in Pennsylvania